PS Lugard II was a British passenger ferry in Uganda. She was a side wheel paddle steamer with a shallow draught in order to operate on the Victoria Nile and Albert Nile. She was named after Frederick Lugard, 1st Baron Lugard, who late in the previous century had explored Uganda, secured much of it for the British Empire and served as its Military Administrator 1890–92.

Kenya and Uganda Railways and Harbours (KURH) ordered Lugard II to replace its only side wheel paddle steamer, PS Lugard, that had been in service since 1927. Fleming and Ferguson of Paisley in Renfrewshire, Scotland built Lugard II in 1946. She was delivered via Kisumu in Kenya. Therefore, she would have been a "knock down" vessel; that is, she was bolted together in the shipyard at Paisley, all the parts marked with numbers, disassembled into many hundreds of parts and transported in kit form by sea to Mombasa and then by rail as far as Kisumu.

Lugard II operated on the Albert Nile between Pakwach and the border town of Nimule in Sudan. Her capacity was supplemented by pushing a barge or lighter that provided third class accommodation as well as cargo space.

In that year KURH's successor, the East African Railways and Harbours Corporation (EAR&H), opened its northern Uganda branch line from Tororo to Pakwach, giving a new connection with Lugard II'''s Albert Nile service and superseding the Victoria Nile ferries.Lugard II'' was herself withdrawn from service a few years later, and in 1967 EARH offered her for sale.

References

1946 ships
Ships built on the River Clyde
Ferries of Uganda
Paddle steamers